The AIR Awards of 2014 (or Carlton Dry Independent Music Awards of 2014) is the ninth annual Australian Independent Record Labels Association Music Awards (generally known as the AIR Awards) and was an award ceremony at The Meat Market, North Melbourne on 8 October 2014. The event was sponsored by Australian liquor brand, Carlton Dry with Levi Jeans coming on board as a supporting partner in 2014.

Performers
Sheppard 
DMA's
Safia
Meg Mac

Nominees and winners

AIR Awards
Winners are listed first and highlighted in boldface; other final nominees are listed alphabetically.

See also
Music of Australia

References

2014 in Australian music
2014 music awards
AIR Awards